Darvoz District (Nohiyai Darvoz) is a district in Tajikistan, located at the extreme north-west of the Gorno-Badakhshan Autonomous Region. It borders on Afghanistan to the south, along the Panj, and within Tajikistan on Khatlon Region to the west and on the Districts of Republican Subordination to the north. Its administrative capital is Qal'ai Khumb. The population of Darvoz district is 24,000 (1 January 2020 estimate). The district was historically part of the Darvaz principality, a semi-independent statelet ruled by a mir.

Administrative divisions
They are as follows:

See also
Darvaz (region)
Darwaz District

References

Districts of Tajikistan
Gorno-Badakhshan Autonomous Region